Sligo was a parliamentary constituency represented in Dáil Éireann, the lower house of the Irish parliament or Oireachtas from 1937 to 1948. The constituency elected 3 deputies (Teachtaí Dála, commonly known as TDs) to the Dáil, on the system of proportional representation by means of the single transferable vote (PR-STV).

History
The constituency was created for the 1937 general election, when the Electoral (Revision of Constituencies) Act 1935 split the old Leitrim–Sligo constituency, with County Leitrim being represented from 1937 through the new Leitrim constituency.

Under the Electoral (Amendment) Act 1947, the Sligo constituency was abolished, and the Sligo–Leitrim constituency was created for the 1948 general election.

Boundaries
Some Dáil constituencies cross county boundaries, in order to ensure a reasonably consistent ratio of electors to TDs. The Electoral (Revision of Constituencies) Act 1935 defined the boundaries of the Sligo constituency as being:
"The administrative County of Sligo except the portion thereof which is comprised in the County Constituency of Leitrim."

The boundaries of the Leitrim constituency were defined as:
"The administrative County of Leitrim and The District Electoral Divisions of: Ballintogher East, Ballynakill, Ballynashee, Cliffony North, Cliffony South, Drumcolumb, Killadoon, Kilmactranny, Rossinver East and Shancough in the administrative County of Sligo."

TDs

Elections

1944 general election

1943 general election

1938 general election

1937 general election

See also
Dáil constituencies
Politics of the Republic of Ireland
Historic Dáil constituencies
Elections in the Republic of Ireland

References

External links
Oireachtas Members Database

Historic constituencies in County Sligo
Dáil constituencies in the Republic of Ireland (historic)
1937 establishments in Ireland
1948 disestablishments in Ireland
Constituencies established in 1937
Constituencies disestablished in 1948